Kyle Casciaro (born 2 December 1987) is a Gibraltarian footballer who plays for Bruno's Magpies, and the Gibraltar national team, where he plays as a winger or forward.

Club career
Casciaro came through the ranks of Lincoln Red Imps with brothers Ryan and Lee, becoming ever present in the dominant Red Imps team that won 6 of its 14 consecutive league titles from 2010 to 2016. After suffering a serious injury in summer 2017, he retired from football. However, in January 2018 he came out of retirement, re-joining Lincoln while joining FC Olympique 13 on loan for the rest of the season, in order to regain match fitness. He announced his departure from Lincoln again on Twitter, in June 2019.

International career
Casciaro made his international debut with Gibraltar on 19 November 2013 in a 0–0 home draw with Slovakia. This was Gibraltar's first game since being admitted to UEFA He was the first Gibraltarian footballer to score a winning goal at senior international level since joining UEFA, having struck against Malta in June 2014.

International goals

International career statistics

Personal life
Casciaro works as a shipping agent at Cory Brothers in Gibraltar. His brothers Lee and Ryan have also played with Gibraltar's national side.

References

External links
 
 

1987 births
Living people
Gibraltarian footballers
Gibraltar international footballers
Association football midfielders
Association football forwards
F.C. Olympique 13 players
Lincoln Red Imps F.C. players
St Joseph's F.C. players
F.C. Bruno's Magpies players
Gibraltar Premier Division players
Gibraltar pre-UEFA international footballers